Wangkangurru or Wangganguru  is an extinct Australian Aboriginal language of the Pama–Nyungan family. It was a dialect of Arabana spoken by the Wangkangurru people.

Wangganguru had the full range of consonants of the prototypical Australian language. Several of the nasals and laterals were allophonically prestopped.

References

Karnic languages